The 1978 Australian Professional Championship was a professional non-ranking snooker tournament, which took place between 4 and 15 December 1978 at the Grafton Services Club in Grafton, Australia.

Eddie Charlton won the tournament defeating Ian Anderson 29–13 in the final.

Results

Group stage

 Eddie Charlton 8–1 Dennis Wheelwright
 Eddie Charlton 8–1 Jim Charlton
 Warren Simpson 12–3 Dennis Wheelwright
 Ian Anderson 8–6 Paddy Morgan
 Ian Anderson 8–2 Philip Tarrant
 Philip Tarrant 8–6 Lou Condo
 Eddie Charlton 8–0 Warren Simpson

Final
 Eddie Charlton 29–13 Ian Anderson

References

Australian Professional Championship
1978 in snooker
1978 in Australian sport